Faith + Hope + Love is the eighteenth album in the live praise and worship series of Christian Contemporary music by Hillsong Church. It was recorded live at the Sydney Entertainment Centre on 29 March 2009 by the Hillsong Live Worship team led by Reuben Morgan, Darlene Zschech and Joel Houston. One of the most acclaimed songs on the album is "It's Your Love" sung by Darlene Zschech.

Album information
Joel Houston stated, "Beyond the sound, the rhythm, the art... beyond the strings, the keys, the melodies... beyond the stage, the set, the lights... are the people. Ordinary men, women & children, from all walks of life, in all sorts of circumstances and each one with a unique story to tell. This is the Church... and this is Hillsong's 18th live praise and worship album 'faith+hope+love'. Everyone together playing their part and lending their voice to the collective story, our story. The prayer is that 'Faith+Hope+Love' will breathe the light, love and freedom of Christ into your life, and continue to give expression to what God is doing in and through people all over the Earth."

The songs "You Hold Me Now" and "No Reason to Hide" are also featured on the later Hillsong United album Across the Earth: Tear Down the Walls, released May 2009.

This is the first Hillsong Live album that does not feature worship leader Marty Sampson since "Touching Heaven Changing Earth" in 1998. It is also the first Hillsong Live album not to take its name from one of its songs.

This album was released in Spain 28 July 2009.

The majority of the songs were written by Reuben Morgan, Joel Houston, Matt Crocker, and Marty Sampson.

Brooke Fraser, Jad Gillies, Mia Fieldes, Jonathon Douglass, Jill McCloghry, Sam Knock, Robert Fergusson, Leeland Mooring, Jack Mooring, and Darlene Zschech contributed songs also.

Track listing (CD)

Track listing (DVD)
 No Reason To Hide (Joel Houston)
 God One and Only (Jonathon Douglass)
 It's Your Love (Darlene Zschech)
 I Will Exalt You (Brooke Fraser)
 Yahweh (Dave Ware & Darlene Zschech)
 The First and The Last (Joel Houston)
 For Your Name (Jad Gillies)
 Glow (Dave Ware)
 The Wonder of Your Love (Darlene Zschech)
 His Glory Appears (Brooke Fraser)
 We The Redeemed (Jill McCloghry)
 We Will See Him (Reuben Morgan)
 You Hold Me Now (Jad Gillies)

Charts

Awards

The album was nominated for a Dove Award for Long Form Music Video of the Year at the 41st GMA Dove Awards.

Personnel

 Darlene Zschech - senior worship leader, senior lead vocal, songwriter
 Reuben Morgan - worship pastor, worship leader, acoustic guitar, lead vocal
 Joel Houston - creative director, worship leader, acoustic guitar, vocal
 Brooke Fraser - worship leader, acoustic guitar
 Jad Gillies - worship leader, vocal, electric guitar, acoustic guitar on "You Hold Me Now"
 Jonathon Douglass (JD) - worship leader, vocal
 Dave Ware - worship leader, vocals
 Jill McCloghry - Worship leader, acoustic guitar
 Annie Garratt - leader backup vocal
 Matty Crocker - leader backup vocal
 Katie Dodson - back vocal
 Sam Knock - back vocal
 Kathryn de Araujo - back vocal
 Esther Donnelly - back vocal
 Emily Hayes - back vocal
 Karen Horn - back vocal
 Anneka Knock - back vocal
 Catherine Vasilakis - back vocal
 Nigel Hendroff - electric & acoustic guitar, music director & arranger
 Ben Fielding - electric guitar
 Timon Klein - electric guitar
 Grant Klassen - electric guitar
 Autumn Hardman - keyboards, music director
 David Andrew - keyboards
 Peter James - keyboards
 Roland James - keyboards
 Matthew Tennikoff - bass guitar
 Adam Crosariol - bass guitar
 Joshua Gagner - bass 
 Bob Mpofu - bass
 Ben Whincop - bass guitar
 Rolf Wam Fjell - drums
 Brandon Gillies - drums
 Gabriel Kelly - drums
 Simon Kobler - drums
 Leora Gardner - violin
 Hanna Crezee - violin
 Celeste Shackleton - cello
 Marc Warry - trombone
 Elizabeth Gorringe - French horn
 Tim Whincop - trumpet
 The Hillsong Choir

Creative arts

Joel Houston - creative director
Jay Argaet - artwork manager, art director
Nicole Scott - art director, digital designing
Giles Lambert - cover concept and design
Adan Hancock - creative contributor
Glenn Stewart - creative contributor

Production team

 Joel Houston – producer
 Reuben Morgan – producer
 Ben Whincop – audio engineer
 Andrew Crawford – audio engineer
 Jim Monk – audio engineer
 Josh Telford – audio engineer
 James Hurley – audio engineer
 Brad Law – live record production management
 Tim Whincop – project manager
 Laura Kelly – project co–ordinator
 Josh Bonett – event stage direction
 Lacey Parsons – event stage direction
 Nathan Taylor – event stage direction
 Andrew Starke – technical director
 Ryan Watts-Thomas – technical director
 Lukas Jundt – technical director
 Grant Baker – technical director
 Ashley Byron – stage manager
 Eliane Weyermann – stage manager
 Jessica Williams – stage manager
 Kai Arne Martinson – stage manager
 Kevin Kwan – stage manager
 Sage Williams – stage manager
 Gary Chan – stage manager
 Julie Lachapelle – stage manager
 Adam Dodson – stage manager
 Michael Cuthbertson – event production manager, front of house engineer
 Bentleigh Tadman – front of house engineer
 Paul Ross – front of house comms
 Muchiri Gateri – monitor engineer
 Laura Cooper – monitor engineer
 Nelda Samy – monitor engineer
 Andrew Starr – monitor engineer
 Reid Wall – monitor engineer
 Solomon Mickley – monitor engineer

References

External links
Hillsong page

2018

2009 live albums
2009 video albums
Live video albums
Hillsong Music live albums
Hillsong Music video albums

pt:Faith + Hope + Love